Jon Fausty (born February 20, 1949 ) is a multiple Grammy Award-winning sound and recording engineer best known for his work on some of the most successful Latin albums ever recorded.

Fausty's career has spanned over six decades. He has designed studios, produced and engineered recordings throughout the United States, Canada, Cuba and Europe - both in studio and live performances.

Early career
Born in Westchester, New York of Russian and Hungarian Jewish ancestry, Fausty “helped shape the sound of Latin music.”  Fausty originally wanted to be a radio disc jockey but became interested in sound engineering after a chance visit in 1960 to Mirasound Studios in Manhattan. The engineers allowed him watch and learn.  His first job was at Groove Sound studios where he became Wiley C. Brooks assistant. After Brooks left, Fausty became the chief engineer at 18 years old. He remained at Groove Studios for one year.

His first Latin recording was for the Cesta All-Stars at Groove Sound. New to Latin music and Latin instruments, he thought that he had botched the recording.  He next went to Delta Studios where he recorded jingles and commercials – and this is where he honed his skills. While at Delta, he recorded an Album with Willie Rosario, Charlie Palmieri and Manique. These recordings allowed him to learn the “mathematics” of the salsa sound (clave & tumbao).

Later career

After a chance meeting with Larry Harlow at a friend's jam session, Harlow would later call Fausty and ask him to audition at Good Vibrations Sound Studios (formerly RKO Sound Studios) which was owned by Fania Records. Out of approximately 40 candidates Fausty was hired. Fausty was instrumental in fitting the studio with the latest technology including a retractable ceiling designed specifically to isolate the percussion sections from interfering with other aspects of the recording.
 
He has recorded with Willie Colon, Hector Lavoe, Ray Barreto, Johnny Pacheco, Sonora Poncena, Roberto Roena, Cheo Feliciano, Lebron Brothers, Ismael Miranda, Larry Harlow, Tipica 73, Fania All-Stars, Bobby Valentin, Javier Vazquez, Pete El Conde Rodriguez, Mon Rivera, Tommy Olivencia, Caco, Mongo Santamaria, Lalo Rodriguez, Simon Perez, Rocky Pagan, Joe Cuba, Puerto Rico All-Stars, La Lupe, Diego Melon, El Gran Combo, Willie Rosario, Johnny “Dandy” Rodriguez, Jerry Gonzales, Eddie Palmieiri, Kip Hanrahan, Jack Bruce, Milton Cardona, Roberto Torres, Conjunto Classico, Daniel Ponce, Los Van Van, David Burn, Angel Canales, Christie Mcfol, Astor Piozole, Justo Betancourt, Johnny Ventura, Luis Ramirez, Bobby Rodriguez, Paco Vazquez, Munequitos de Matanzas, Tito Puente, Hilton Ruiz, Bronx Horns, Orlando Valle, Paquito D'Rivera, Yomo Toro, Gilberto Santarosa, Chucho Valdez, Many Oquendo, Puerto Rican Power, Grupo Niche, Chico O'Farrill, George Benson, Jack Bruce, Vocal Sampling, Tito Nieves, Fernando Villalona, Victor Manuelle, Luis Perico Ortiz, Los Vacillos, Esau Delgado, Angel Melendez, Machito Rivera, Ralphy Levit amongst others.

“…Jon Fausty[] generally stayed away from special
effects and emphasized capturing performances simply, cleanly, and fast, with
the high-quality equipment that was by then a given, even in the more modest
New York studios. The net result is that many salsa records from the 1970s
through the early 1980s have a timeless, classic sound, which has dated little.”

He has thousands of recordings  of which 18 have been awarded Grammy Awards.  He has won Grammys with Chucho Valdez, Celia Cruz, Ruben Blades, Marc Anthony.

Selected Discography

1961	Sabu's Jazz Espagnole	Sabu Martinez	Remastering
1965	Mozambique	Eddie Palmieri	Remastering
1966	Bad Breath	Bobby Valentín	Remastering
1967	Bravo Celia Cruz	Celia Cruz	Remastering
1967	Con Todos los Hierro	Cortijo / Ismael Rivera	Remastering
1967	Jala Jala y Boogaloo	Ricardo Ray	Remastering
1968	Hacheros Pa' un Palo	La Sonora Ponceña	Remastering
1968	The Hustler	Willie Colón	Remastering
1968	The Tingling Mother's Circus	The Tingling Mother's Circus	Engineer
1968	Soul of Machito	Machito	Remastering
1970	Algo Nuevo	Bobby Valentín	Remastering
1970	Conjunto Clasico	Conjunto Clasico	Engineer
1971	Chivirico [1971]	Chivirico Davila	Engineer
1971	Live at the Cheetah, Vol. 1	Fania All-Stars	Engineer, Audio Engineer
1972	Desde Puerto Rico a Nueva York	La Sonora Ponceña	Remastering
1972	En La Union Esta La Fuerza	The Lebrón Brothers	Remastering
1972	La Sonora Poncena	La Sonora Ponceña	Engineer
1972	Recorded Live at Sing Sing, Vol. 1	Eddie Palmieri	Remastering
1972	The Message	Ray Barretto	Remastering
1972	Visitation	Chirco	Production Engineer, Mixing Engineer
1973	Asalto Navideño, Vol. 2	Willie Colón / Héctor Lavoe	Engineer, Audio Engineer
1973	Asi Se Compone un Son	Ismael Miranda	Engineer, Audio Engineer
1973	Asunto de Familia	The Lebrón Brothers	Engineer
1973	Chivirico [1973]	Chivirico Davila	Engineer, Audio Engineer
1973	Felicidades	Cheo Feliciano	Engineer
1973	Indestructible	Ray Barretto	Engineer, Audio Engineer, Liner Notes
1973	Infinito	Willie Rosario	Engineer
1973	Lo Mato	Willie Colón	Engineer, Audio Engineer, Remastering
1973	Roberto Roena y su Apollo Sound, Vol. 5	Roberto Roena / Su Apollo Sound	Engineer, Audio Engineer, Recording Director
1973	The Other Road	Ray Barretto	Engineer
1973	Tres de Café y Dos de Azúcar	Johnny Pacheco	Engineer
1974	Celia & Johnny	Celia Cruz / Johnny Pacheco	Engineer
1974	El Conde	Pete "El Conde" Rodríguez	Engineer, Audio Production
1974	En Fa Menor	Ismael Miranda	Engineer
1974	En Una Nota!	Monguito Santamaria	Mixing Engineer, Recording
1974	In Motion	Bobby Valentín	Engineer, Audio Engineer
1974	La Verdad (The Truth)	Javier Vazquez y Su Salsa	Engineer, Mixing Engineer
1974	Latin-Soul-Rock	Fania All-Stars	Mixing
1974	Live at Yankee Stadium	Mongo Santamaría	Mixing, Mixing Engineer
1974	Love Is...Seguida	Seguida	Assistant
1974	Rey del Bajo	Bobby Valentín	Engineer, Audio Engineer
1974	Roberto Roena y su Apollo Sound, Vol. 6	Roberto Roena	Engineer, Audio Engineer
1974	Salsa	Larry Harlow / Orchestra Harlow	Engineer, Audio Engineer
1975	Barretto	Ray Barretto	Engineer, Remastering
1975	El Judio Maravilloso	Orchestra Harlow	Remastering
1975	El Maestro	Johnny Pacheco	Engineer
1975	Escucha mi Canción	Paquito Guzmán	Engineer
1975	Este Es Ismael Miranda	Ismael Miranda	Engineer
1975	La Voz	Héctor Lavoe	Engineer, Audio Engineer, Liner Notes
1975	Live at Yankee Stadium, Vol. 1	Fania All-Stars	Mixing
1975	Planté Bandera	Tommy Olivencia	Engineer, Audio Engineer, Remastering
1975	The Good, the Bad, the Ugly	Willie Colón	Engineer, Audio Engineer
1975	There Goes the Neighborhood	Willie Colón / Mon Rivera	Engineer, Remastering
1975	Tremendo Caché	Celia Cruz / Johnny Pacheco	Engineer
1976	Andy Harlow's Latin Fever	Andy Harlow	Engineer
1976	Cocinando la Salsa (Cookin' the Sauce)	Joe Cuba / Joe Cuba Sextet	Engineer
1976	Con Mi Viejo Amigo	Ismael Miranda	Engineer
1976	Conquista Musical	La Sonora Ponceña	Engineer
1976	De Ti Depende (It's Up to You)	Héctor Lavoe	Engineer, Audio Engineer
1976	El Gigante del Sur	La Sonora Ponceña	Engineer, Mixing
1976	Este Negro Si Es Sabroso	Pete "El Conde" Rodríguez	Audio Engineer
1976	I Can See	Ralfi Pagan	Engineer, Mixing
1976	Introducing Lalo Rodríguez and Simon Pérez	Tommy Olivencia	Engineer, Audio Engineer
1976	Live at Yankee Stadium, Vol. 2	Fania All-Stars	Mixing, Remastering, Mixing Engineer
1976	Lucky 7	Roberto Roena	Engineer, Audio Engineer, Remastering
1976	Para Mi Gente	Chivirico Davila	Engineer, Mixing
1976	Rhythm in the House	Hilton Ruiz	Engineer
1976	Sofrito	Mongo Santamaría	Engineer
1976	Tomorrow: Barretto Live	Ray Barretto	Engineer
1976	Tribute to Tito Rodriguez	Fania All-Stars	Engineer, Mixing
1976	Ubane	Mongo Santamaría	Engineer
1976	Union Dinamica	Kako	Engineer
1977	10th Anniversary	The Lebrón Brothers	Engineer, Recording
1977	Con Salsa y Sabor: Charlie Palmieri & Menique	Charlie Palmieri	Remastering
1977	El Jardinero del Amor	Larry Harlow	Engineer
1977	La Raza Latina: A Salsa Suite	Larry Harlow / Orchestra Harlow	Engineer, Mixing
1977	Llego Melon	Johnny Pacheco	Engineer
1977	Metiendo Mano!	Rubén Blades / Willie Colón	Engineer
1977	Mintiendo se Gana Más	Paquito Guzmán	Mixing
1977	No Voy Al Festival	Ismael Miranda	Engineer, Remastering
1977	One of a Kind (Unica en Su Clase)	La Lupe	Engineer
1977	Only They Could Have Made This Album	Willie Colón / Celia Cruz	Engineer, Audio Engineer
1977	Puerto Rico All Stars	Puerto Rico All Stars	Engineer, Mixing
1977	Roberto Roena y su Apollo Sound, Vol. 9	Roberto Roena	Engineer
1978	49 Minutes	Willie Colón	Engineer
1978	A Todo Mis Amigos	Celia Cruz	Remastering
1978	Comedia	Héctor Lavoe	Engineer, Mixing
1978	El Albino Divino	Larry Harlow	Engineer, Mixing
1978	El Progreso	Roberto Roena	Remastering
1978	Explorando	La Sonora Ponceña	Engineer, Audio Engineer
1978	Fiesta de Soneros	Tommy Olivencia	Mixing, Recording
1978	La 8va. Maravilla	Roberto Roena	Engineer
1978	Peligro	Paquito Guzmán	Engineer, Mixing
1978	Siembra	Rubén Blades / Willie Colón	Engineer, Audio Engineer, Liner Notes
1978	The Brillante	Celia Cruz	Engineer
1979	El Rey del Ritmo	Willie Rosario	Engineer
1979	Recordando a Felipe Pirela	Héctor Lavoe	Engineer, Mixing
1979	Solo	Willie Colón	Engineer, Audio Engineer, Recording Director, Live Sound Engineer
1980	Dandy's Dandy: A Latin Affair	Latin Percussionists	Engineer, Remixing
1980	El De a 20 De Willie	Willie Rosario	Mixing
1980	Maestra Vida: Primera Parte	Rubén Blades	Engineer, Audio Engineer, Mixing
1980	Maestra Vida: Segunda Parte	Rubén Blades	Engineer, Audio Engineer, Mixing
1980	Unity	El Gran Combo de Puerto Rico	Engineer
1981	Canciones del Solar de los Aburridos	Rubén Blades / Willie Colón	Engineer
1981	Carabali	Carabali	Mixing
1981	Fantasmas	Willie Colón	Engineer, Audio Engineer, Remixing
1981	Happy Days	El Gran Combo de Puerto Rico	Mixing
1981	The Portrait of a Salsa Man	Willie Rosario	Mixing
1982	Calidad	Adalberto Santiago	Remastering
1982	Corazón Guerrero	Willie Colón	Engineer, Audio Engineer, Technical Director
1982	Coup de Tête	Kip Hanrahan	Engineer, Mixing, Editing, Overdubs
1982	Criollo	The Lebrón Brothers	Remastering
1982	Desire Develops an Edge	Kip Hanrahan	Engineer, Mixing
1982	El Encuentro	Johnny Rodriguez y Su Orquestra	Engineer, Mixing
1982	Super Apollo 47:50	Roberto Roena / Adalberto Santiago	Remastering
1982	The Last Fight	Rubén Blades / Willie Colón	Engineer, Mixing
1982	The River Is Deep	Jerry González	Mixing
1982	Totico Y Sus Rumberos	Totico Y Sus Rumberos	Engineer, Remastering, Digital Remastering
1982	Ya Yo Me Cure	Jerry González	Engineer
1982	Yo Soy Latino	Larry Harlow / Orchestra Harlow	Engineer
1983	Bahia	Gato Barbieri	Remastering
1983	El Que la Hace la Paga	Rubén Blades	Engineer, Mixing
1983	Vigilante	Willie Colón / Héctor Lavoe	Engineer, Mixing, Recording Director
1984	Carabali 2	Carabali	Mixing
1984	Lo Que Pide La Gente	Fania All-Stars	Remastering
1985	A Few Short Notes from the End Run	Kip Hanrahan	Engineer
1985	Bembe	Milton Cardona	Engineer, Audio Engineer
1985	Conjure: Music for the Texts of Ishmael Reed		Mixing
1985	Vertical's Currency	Kip Hanrahan	Engineer, Mixing
1986	Elegantemente Criollo	Roberto Torres	Engineer, Mixing
1986	Live in Japan 1976	Fania All-Stars	Remastering
1987	Afro Caribbean Jazz	Batacumbele	Sequencing, Mixdown Engineer
1987	Arawe	Daniel Ponce	Engineer
1987	Asi Es Mi Pueblo	Conjunto Clasico	Engineer
1987	En Su Décimoquinto Aniversario	Johnny Ventura	Engineer
1988	Antecedente	Rubén Blades / Rubén Blades y Son del Solar	Engineer, Mixing
1988	Days and Nights of Blue Luck Inverted	Kip Hanrahan	Engineer, Mixing
1988	Maelo...El Único	Ismael Rivera	Mastering Engineer
1988	Music From Do the Right Thing		Engineer, Mixing, Mixing Engineer
1988	Songo	Los Van Van	Producer, Engineer, Mixing
1988	Windsong	Rachel Faro	Engineer
1989	Live Session, Vol. 2	Steve Nelson / Bobby Watson	Engineer
1989	Rei Momo	David Byrne	Engineer, Production Coordination
1989	Samba de Flora	Airto / Airto Moreira	Engineer
1989	Sueño	Eddie Palmieri	Producer, Engineer, Mixing, Editing
1990	Routes of Rhythm, Vol. 1: Carnival of Cuba		Editing, Post Production Engineer
1990	Routes of Rhythm, Vol. 2 (Cuban Dance Party)		Editing, Post Production Engineer
1990	Rubén Blades y Son del Solar...Live!	Rubén Blades / Rubén Blades y Son del Solar	Mixing
1990	Salt & Tabasco		Producer
1991	Caminando	Rubén Blades / Rubén Blades y Son del Solar	Engineer
1991	Electric Landlady	Kirsty MacColl	Engineer, Audio Engineer, Mixing
1991	Harlem Blues	Satan & Adam	Editing
1991	Salsa Y Sabor		Engineer, Mastering Engineer, Producer, Recording Producer
1991	Ya es Tiempo (It's Time)	Angel Canales	Engineer
1992	Amor y Control	Rubén Blades y Son del Solar	Engineer, Mixing
1992	Con El Sabor De...Roberto Torres	Roberto Torres	Engineer, Mixing, Mezcla
1992	El Caballo Negro	Johnny Ventura	Engineer
1992	Fe Esperanza Y Caridad	Henry Fiol	Engineer, Mixing
1992	Interpretan a Rafael Hernandez	SAR All Stars	Engineer, Mixing
1992	Irresistible	Ray Barretto	Remastering
1992	Justo Betancourt [#1]	Justo Betancourt	Engineer
1992	Llegó la India Vía Eddie Palmieri	India	Engineer, Mixing, Editing
1992	Music Makers	Bonny Cepeda	Engineer
1992	Pa' Bravo Yo	Justo Betancourt	Engineer, Remastering
1992	Pepe Mora	Pepe Mora	Engineer
1992	Recuerda a Portabales	Roberto Torres	Mixing, Mezcla
1992	Rinde Homenaje a Abelardo Barroso	Papaito	Engineer, Mixing
1992	Routes of Rhythm, Vol. 3	Isaac Oviedo	Engineer, Editing
1992	Tango: Zero Hour	Astor Piazzolla	Engineer, Mixing
1992	Y Buena Que Esta...Maria	Johnny Ventura	Engineer
1993	Bonita	Santos Colon	Mixing
1993	Breakout	Papo Vazquez	Engineer
1993	Carlito's Way [Music from the Motion Picture]		Engineer, Mixing
1993	Como Nunca	Orlando Watussi	Mixing
1993	Latin from Manhattan	Bobby Rodriguez	Engineer
1993	Lo Pasado, Pasado	Junior Gonzalez	Mixing
1993	Lo Sabemos	Justo Betancourt	Engineer, Mixing
1993	Mambo Mongo [Fania]	Mongo Santamaría	Mixing, Producer, Recording, Recording Producer
1993	Ode to Life	Don Pullen / Don Pullen & The African-Brazilian Connection	Engineer
1993	Otra Noche Caliente	Louie Ramirez	Engineer, Mixing, Mastering
1993	Preparate Bailador	Ray de la Paz	Engineer
1993	The Late Masterpieces	Astor Piazzolla	Engineer, Mixing
1993	The Rough Dancer and the Cyclical Night (Tango Apasionado)	Astor Piazzolla	Mixing, Mixing Engineer
1993	Willie & Tito	Willie Colón / Tito Puente	Remastering
1994	Canta Fernando Lavoy	Los Soneros	Engineer, Mixing
1994	Charlie Rodriguez & Rey Reyes	Charlie Rodriguez	Engineer, Mezcla
1994	Conjunto Crema	Conjunto Crema	Engineer, Mixing
1994	Darn It!	Paul Haines	Engineer
1994	El Rey de Corazones	Manny Manuel	Mastering
1994	Familia Rmm En Vivo		Producer, Engineer, Director, Mixing
1994	Feliz Christmas	Orquesta de la Luz	Engineer, Mixing
1994	Juan Vicente Zambrano	Sonora Miami	Mixing
1994	Palmas	Eddie Palmieri	Mixing
1994	Poems by Paul Haines Musics by Many	Paul Haines	Engineer
1994	Salsomania	Orquesta Novel	Engineer
1994	Sentimiento Del Latino en Nueva York	Angel Canales	Engineer
1995	"Live" In Puerto Rico: June 11, 1994	Fania All-Stars	Engineer, Audio Engineer, Recording
1995	Arete	Eddie Palmieri	Mixing, Mastering
1995	Blue in the Face [Luaka Bop]		Mixing
1995	Cab Calloway Stands in for the Moon	Conjure	Engineer
1995	Catch the Feeling	The Bronx Horns	Mixing
1995	Charanga Casino [#2]	Charanga Casino	Engineer, Mixing
1995	Fiesta No Es Para Feos	Alfredito Valdez, Jr.	Engineer, Mezcla
1995	Hands on Percussion	Hilton Ruiz	Engineer, Mixing
1995	Ismael Quintana	Ismael Quintana	Engineer
1995	Llego La Ley	Conjunto Clasico	Engineer
1995	Look No Further	Rozalla	Engineer
1995	Luchare	Mickey Taveras	Engineer
1995	Otra Vez Con Amor	Vitín Avíles	Engineer
1995	Rip a Dip	Pucho & His Latin Soul Brothers	Recording
1995	Sabor de la Luz	Orquesta de la Luz	Engineer, Mixing
1995	Si No Bailen con Ellos, No Bailen con Nadie	Conjunto Clasico	Engineer
1995	Sorpresa La Flauta	Andy Harlow	Engineer, Audio Engineer, Mixing
1995	The Perez Family		Engineer, Mixing
1995	Tito's Idea	Tito Puente	Engineer, Mastering
1995	Trombone Man	J.P. Torres	Engineer, Mixing, Mastering
1995	Una Forma Mas	Vocal Sampling	Mixing
1995	Vacunao	Los Muñequitos de Matanzas	Engineer
1996	Celebremos Navidad	Yomo Toro	Engineer
1996	Combinacion Perfecta		Engineer, Mixing, Recording
1996	Cuba Jazz	Paquito D'Rivera	Engineer, Mastering
1996	Fuji Time	Adewale Ayuba	Engineer
1996	Gran Encuentro		Mastering
1996	Havana Calling	Maraca y Otra Vision	Mixing
1996	Ito Iban Echu: Sacred Yoruba Music of Cuba	Los Muñequitos de Matanzas	Engineer
1996	Jazzin'	Tito Puente	Engineer, Audio Engineer, Mixing, Mastering
1996	Nada Sera Igual	Jesus Enriquez	Engineer, Mixing
1996	Papa Boco	Adela Dalto	Engineer, Mixing
1996	Punto De Partida	Amparo Sandino	Mixing
1996	Salsa Explosion [1996]		Engineer, Post Producer, Live Recording
1996	Super Cuban All Stars: Made in the USA		Engineer, Mixing
1996	Tropical Tribute to the Beatles		Mixing
1996	TropiJazz All-Stars, Vol. 1	TropiJazz All-Stars	Engineer, Mixing, Mastering
1996	Vortex	Eddie Palmieri	Engineer, Mastering
1997	A Thousand Nights and a Night (Shadow Night)	Kip Hanrahan	Engineer, Mixing
1997	Cuban Gold, Vol. 3: Mambo Me Priva		Mastering
1997	De Corazón	Gilberto Santa Rosa	Mixing
1997	De Vacaciones	Vocal Sampling	Mixing
1997	Island Eyes	Hilton Ruiz	Engineer, Mixing, Mastering
1997	Monsters from the Deep	Ned Sublette / Lawrence Weiner	Engineer, Mastering
1997	Que Vacile Mi Gente	D'Mingo	Mixing
1997	Reconfirmando	Johnny Almendra	Mastering
1997	Rise	Veronica	Mixing
1997	TropiJazz All-Stars, Vol. 2	TropiJazz All-Stars	Engineer, Mixing, Mastering
1998	Bele Bele en La Habana	Chucho Valdés	Engineer, Mixing, Mixing Engineer
1998	Cielo de Acuarela	Lourdes Robles	Engineer, Mixing
1998	Como Tu Quieras	Ray de la Paz	Engineer
1998	Cuban Gold, Vol. 5: Pa Bailar		Mastering
1998	Dance with Me		Engineer, Mixing
1998	Dancemania '99: Live at Birdland	Tito Puente	Engineer, Mixing
1998	Demasiado Corazon	Willie Colón	Mixing
1998	El Rumbero del Piano	Eddie Palmieri	Engineer, Mixing
1998	Imaginate	Raúl Paz	Engineer
1998	Live	Chucho Valdés	Mixing
1998	Live [CD]	Los Jovenes del Barrio	Mixing
1998	Nadie Nos Va a Detener	Salsa Kids	Mastering
1998	Regalo del Ciego (Blindman's Gift)	Son de Loma	Engineer, Mixing
1998	Shadow Nights, Vol. 1	Kip Hanrahan	Engineer
1999	Ahora	Manny Oquendo	Engineer
1999	Ancestral Reflections	Frank Emilio Flynn	Engineer, Mixing
1999	Briyumba Palo Congo	Chucho Valdés	Engineer
1999	Cambucha	Milton Cardona	Engineer
1999	Cowboy Rumba	Ned Sublette	Engineer
1999	El Son de Ahora	Carolina Laó	Mixing
1999	Mambo Birdland	Tito Puente	Engineer, Mixing
1999	Piazzolla: La Camorra	Astor Piazzolla	Engineer
1999	Shadow Nights, Vol. 2	Kip Hanrahan	Engineer
1999	Simplemente Yayo	Yayo el Indio	Mixing Engineer, Recording
1999	Tratame Como Soy	Nora	Mixing Engineer
2000	A Calm in the Fire of Dances	Deep Rumba	Engineer
2000	A Golpe de Folklore	Grupo Niche	Engineer
2000	Absolute Benson	George Benson	Engineer
2000	Asi Soy	Charlie Cruz	Engineer, Mixing, Remix Engineer
2000	Carambola	Chico O'Farrill	Mixing
2000	Celia Cruz and Friends: A Night of Salsa	Celia Cruz	Producer, Mixing, Live Recording
2000	Es Deferente	Los Jovenes del Barrio	Producer
2000	Latitudes	Alfredo de la Fé	Engineer, Mixing
2000	Live at the Village Vanguard	Chucho Valdés	Engineer
2000	Los New Yorkinos	Manny Oquendo	Engineer, Mixing Engineer
2000	Masterpiece/Obra Maestra	Eddie Palmieri / Tito Puente	Engineer, Mixing
2000	Men in Salsa	Puerto Rican Power Orchestra	Mixing
2000	Romantico Y Salsero	Raúl Marrero	Mixing
2000	Soneros de Cuba Y New York	Angelo Vaillant	Engineer
2000	Soy La Ley	Pete "El Conde" Rodríguez	Remastering
2001	60 Anos de Historia Grabado en Copacabana		Engineer, Mixing
2001	Cambio de Tiempo	Vocal Sampling	Engineer, Mixing
2001	Gourmet Music Deluxe: Brazil		Engineer, Mixing
2001	Intenso	Gilberto Santa Rosa	Engineer, Mixing, Recording
2001	La Negra Tiene Tumbao	Celia Cruz	Mixing Engineer
2001	Selections 1997-2000	Monday Michiru	Engineer, Mixing
2001	Shadows in the Air	Jack Bruce	Engineer, Mixing
2001	Solo: Live in New York	Chucho Valdés	Sequencers
2001	Un Chico Malo	Charlie Cruz	Engineer
2001	Wild Wild Salsa	Puerto Rican Power Orchestra	Mixing Engineer
2002	2002 Latin Grammy Nominees		Engineer
2002	Brazilian Flavour, Vol. 2		Engineer, Mixing
2002	Caraluna	Bacilos	Engineer, Mixing
2002	Jamming	Luis "Perico" Ortíz	Engineer, Mezcla
2002	La Perfecta II	Eddie Palmieri	Engineer, Mixing, Mixing Engineer
2002	Le Preguntaba a la Luna	Víctor Manuelle	Mastering
2002	Mal Acostumbrado	Fernando Villalona	Engineer, Mixing
2002	Muy Agradecido	Tito Nieves	Mixing
2002	Tremenda Rumba! [Ahi-nama]	Maraca	Engineer, Mixing
2002	Viceversa	Gilberto Santa Rosa	Mezcla
2003	A Puro Fuego	Olga Tañón	Engineer
2003	Cigar Lounge, Vol. 3		Engineer
2003	Cravin	Shae	Mixing
2003	Cubalive!: Recorded Live in Cuba		Editing, Post Production Engineer
2003	Inesperado	Frankie Negron	Engineer, Mixing
2003	More Jack Than God	Jack Bruce	Engineer, Mixing
2003	Music for My Peoples	Huey Dunbar	Engineer, Mixing Engineer
2003	New Conceptions	Chucho Valdés	Mixing
2003	Regalo del Alma	Celia Cruz	Engineer, Mezcla
2003	Ritmo Caliente	Eddie Palmieri	Engineer, Mixing
2003	Versos en el Cielo	Issac Delgado	Engineer, Mixing
2004	Angel Meléndez & the 911 Mambo Orchestra	Angel Meléndez	Engineer, Audio Engineer, Mixing
2004	Auténtico	Gilberto Santa Rosa	Engineer, Mezcla
2004	Ay! Que Rico	Jose Conde y Ola Fresca	Mixing Engineer
2004	Clásicas De Clásico	Conjunto Clasico	Engineer, Mesclatge
2004	Daniel Santos Con Conjunto Clasico	Daniel Santos	Engineer, Mixing
2004	El Panadero	Conjunto Clasico	Engineer
2004	Havana Dreams	Sonia Santana	Mixing Engineer
2004	La Experiencia	Celia Cruz	Engineer, Mastering Engineer, Recording
2004	Las Puertas Abiertas	Conjunto Clasico	Engineer
2004	Live at Yankee Stadium	Fania All-Stars	Mixing
2004	Rasin Kreyol	Emeline Michel	Engineer, Mixing
2004	Romantico	Cheo Feliciano	Remastering
2004	The Big 3: Live at the Blue Note	The Palladium Orchestra	Engineer, Mixing
2004	The Greatest Live Recordings of Fania All Stars	Fania All-Stars	Engineer
2004	Valio la Pena	Marc Anthony	Engineer, Audio Engineer, Mixing
2004	Yo!	Silvana Deluigi	Engineer
2005	Bembé en Mi Casa	Nachito Herrera	Mixing
2005	Concord Picante 25th Anniversary Collection		Engineer, Mixing, Recording
2005	Conjunto Candela '79	Conjunto Candela	Engineer, Mezcla
2005	From Croydon to Cuba: An Anthology	Kirsty MacColl	Engineer, Mixing
2005	Imaginate	La Charanga 76	Engineer, Mezcla
2005	Listen Here!	Eddie Palmieri	Engineer, Audio Engineer, Mixing
2005	Retrato Musical	Chocolate	Engineer
2005	Soy Yo	Maraca	Mixing
2005	The Best of Kirsty MacColl	Kirsty MacColl	Engineer
2006	El Maestro: A Man and His Music	Johnny Pacheco	Recording
2006	Every Child Is Born A Poet: The Life & Work of Piri Thomas	Piri Thomas	Engineer
2006	Nightlife/Essence of Life	Benitez & Nebula	Engineer
2006	Salsa at Woodstock Recorded Live	Bobby Rodriguez	Engineer
2007	A Night of Salsa: Broadway Edition	Celia Cruz	Engineer, Mixing
2007	Asalto Navideño, Vols. 1-2	Willie Colón / Héctor Lavoe / Yomo Toro	Engineer, Audio Engineer
2007	The Player	Willie Colón	Engineer, Mastering
2007	¡Gracias Joe Cuba!	Nils Fischer / Timbazo	Mixing, Mastering
2008	A Tribute to Gonzalo Asencio Tio Tom 1919-1991	El Conjunto Todo Rumbero / Orlando "Puntilla" Ríos	Audio Engineer, Mixing
2008	Con el Diablo en el Hombro	Damian Rivero	Mixing
2008	Cosquillita	Raphy Leavitt / Raphy Leavitt La Selectra Orchestra	Mixing
2008	Lo Que Quiero Es Fiesta!!!!	Maraca	Audio Engineer, Mixing
2008	The Complete Studio Albums, Vol. 1	Héctor Lavoe	Engineer, Mixing
2009	107th Street Stickball Team: Saboreando Pot Full of Soul	The 107th Street Stickball Team	Engineer
2009	Beautiful Star	Odetta	Engineer
2009	The Complete Studio Albums, Vol. 2	Héctor Lavoe	Engineer
2011	Best of Odetta	Odetta	Engineer
2011	Live at the Milkyway	Jack Bruce / The Cuicoland Express	Engineer
2011	Live in Africa [Fania]	Fania All-Stars	Engineer
2012	"Live" In Puerto Rico: June 11, 1994 [Video]	Fania All-Stars	Engineer
2013	The Very Best of Kirsty MacColl: A New England	Kirsty MacColl	Mixing
2018	Days: 1988-1991	Kirsty MacColl	Engineer, Mixing
2020	Back to the Great Sound	Calle Maestra	Mastering, Mixing
2022	The American Clavé Recordings	Astor Piazzolla	Engineer, Mixing

References

External links

 
 

American audio engineers
American record producers
Latin Grammy Award winners
Latin Grammy Lifetime Achievement Award winners
Salsa
Grammy Award winners
1949 births
Living people